The Seer was an official periodical of the Church of Jesus Christ of Latter-day Saints (LDS Church) which first appeared in 1853 and was published throughout 1854.

History of publication
After the LDS Church publicly acknowledged that it was teaching and practicing plural marriage at its September 1852 conference, LDS Church president Brigham Young dispatched apostle Orson Pratt to Washington, D.C., where he was asked to publish an apologetic magazine targeted at non-Mormons. The primary purpose of the magazine would be to explain and defend the principles of Mormonism.

The first edition of The Seer was published in January 1853, with future editions being produced monthly. The contents of The Seer were composed almost entirely of original writings by Pratt. Throughout its publication history, the majority of Pratt's writing stressed the rationality of the doctrine of plural marriage. For example, Pratt dedicated 107 of the 192 total pages of The Seer to a twelve-part exposition on what he called celestial marriage.

The Seer was published in Washington, D.C., until July 1854, when publication was shifted to Liverpool, England. After only 18 issues, Pratt was forced to cease publication due to mounting financial losses. Circulation peaked at 400 copies in late 1853. "The world will not subscribe for nor read The Seer," Pratt lamented to his brother Parley.

Resulting doctrinal controversy
In 1865, a majority of the First Presidency and the Quorum of the Twelve Apostles of the LDS Church officially condemned some of Pratt's doctrinal declarations contained in The Seer:

"The Seer [and other writings by Pratt] contain doctrines which we cannot sanction, and which we have felt impressed to disown, so that the Saints who now live, and who may live hereafter, may not be misled by our silence, or be left to misinterpret it. Where these objectionable works, or parts of works, are bound in volumes, or otherwise, they should be cut out and destroyed."

Legacy
Despite the failure of The Seer and the controversy that resulted from some of its contents, many of the traditional explanations and justifications for Mormon polygamy had their beginning in Pratt's writings in the magazine.

See also

 List of Latter Day Saint periodicals

Notes

References
 Gary James Bergera, Conflict in the Quorum : Orson Pratt, Brigham Young, Joseph Smith, Salt Lake City: Signature Books, 2002.

External links
 The Seer : searchable PDF scans of Washington D.C. printing
 The Seer (PDF scans), L. Tom Perry Special Collections, Harold B. Lee Library, Brigham Young University.
The Seer : wikisource (incomplete)
 Lance Starr, 'The Seer': Reliable Source?, from FairMormon, an LDS apologetics website

Defunct newspapers published in Washington, D.C.
The Church of Jesus Christ of Latter-day Saints periodicals
Mormonism-related controversies
Publications established in 1853
1853 establishments in Washington, D.C.
Publications disestablished in 1854
1853 in Christianity
19th-century Mormonism
Works about polygamy in Mormonism